The three-volume Galland Manuscript (Paris, Bibliothèque Nationale, MSS arabes 3609, 3610 and 3611), sometimes also referred to as the Syrian Manuscript, is the earliest extensive manuscript of the Thousand and One Nights (the only earlier witness being a ninth-century fragment of a mere sixteen lines). Its text extends to 282 nights, breaking off in the middle of the Tale of Qamar al-Zamān and Budūr. The dating of the manuscript has been the subject of significant debate, which has revolved, unusually, around what types of coins are mentioned in the text and what real-life coin-issues they refer to. Muhsin Mahdi, the manuscript's modern editor, thought that it was fourteenth-century, while Heinz Grotzfeld dated it to the second half of the fifteenth. It is agreed to belong to the fourteenth or fifteenth century and to originate in Syria.

Manuscript copies
A direct copy of the Galland Manuscript from 1592/1593 CE is preserved in the Vatican Library as the second part of the two-volume Cod. Vat. Ar. 782, and has been digitised.

The Galland Manuscript was also the exemplar for much of the Chavis Manuscript, an attempt in the 1780s by Denis Chavis to forge a more Arabic complete manuscript of the Nights, which was itself in turn influential on the development of editions and translations of the Nights.

Editions and translations 
The Galland Manuscript provided the kernel of Antoine Galland's seminal French rendering of the Nights, Les mille et une nuits, contes arabes traduits en français, published in 1704–17. Modern scholarly handlings are:
 The Thousand and One Nights (Alf layla wa-layla), from the Earliest Known Sources, ed. by Muhsin Mahdi, 3 vols (Leiden: Brill, 1984-1994), 
 The Arabian Nights, trans. by Husain Haddawy (New York: Norton, 1990) [repr. along with selections from The Arabian Nights II: Sindbad and Other Popular Stories, trans. by Husain Haddawy (New York: Norton, 1995) as The Arabian Nights: The Husain Haddawy Translation Based on the Text Edited by Muhsin Mahdi, Contexts, Criticism, ed. by Daniel Heller-Roazen (New York: Norton, 2010)]

References 

15th-century books
Arabic manuscripts